Fenqihu is a railway station on the Forestry Bureau Alishan Forest Railway line located in Zhuqi Township, Chiayi County, Taiwan.

History
The station was opened on 1 October 1912. In September 2015, a section of the railway between Fenqihu Station and Alishan Station was badly damaged by Typhoon Dujuan. After restoration efforts, a successful trial run of the train between Beimen Station and Alishan Station was made on 16 September 2015.

Around the station
 Fenchihu Old Street

See also
 List of railway stations in Taiwan

References

1912 establishments in Taiwan
Alishan Forest Railway stations
Railway stations in Chiayi County
Railway stations opened in 1912